Cristina Cornejo may refer to:

  (born 1992), Basque footballer
 Cristina Cornejo (politician) (born 1982), Salvadoran politician
 Cristina Cornejo (weightlifter) (born 1985), Peruvian weightlifter